The Londoner Macao is a casino resort on the Cotai Strip, Macau. On 5 August 2011, Sands China announced that the $4 billion property, long referred to as parcels five and six, would be officially named Sands Cotai Central. The first portion of the resort opened on 11 April 2012. The resort was rebranded as The Londoner Macao in 2021.

History

Development and construction

Architecture firm Aedas was the lead architect for all Las Vegas Sands projects on the Cotai Strip. The firm employed all local consultants and for developing, coordinating and implementing the design. The main contractor was Hsin Chong Construction Group Limited.

In November 2005, Las Vegas Sands announced a deal with Shangri-La Hotels and Resorts for them to manage one hotel tower in the complex, with 500 rooms under their luxury Shangri-La brand and 1,000 rooms under their business-class Traders Hotels brand.

In February 2006, Las Vegas Sands announced a deal with Starwood Hotels to operate two hotel towers in the complex under their Sheraton Hotels brand and a third hotel tower under their luxury St. Regis Hotels brand.

Construction of the project was slowed and complicated in part by government restrictions on how many foreign workers could be hired in the labor-starved territory. According to the main contractor: "Work started in 2006 but the project went through a period of suspension due to the global economic crisis. During this period, work on the project came to a complete stop and it was therefore quite a challenge to restart the project. Staff had to be recruited and contractors engaged. Over 130 contractors were involved in the project. The imported labour quota restrictions have also been challenging."

The number of gaming tables at the resort was a thorny issue as well, since the local government imposed a cap on tables until 2013. The company stated in early August 2011 that Sands Cotai Central would have up to 530 tables versus the 670 it was planning previously.

On 24 March 2011, Las Vegas Sands announced it had terminated its management agreement with Shangri-La Hotels and Resorts for the hotels they were to manage. On 5 August 2011, Sands China announced that they had signed franchise deals with Hilton Worldwide and InterContinental Hotels to replace Shangri-La and brand over 1,800 rooms at Cotai site 5 and 6 under Hilton's luxury Conrad Hotels brand and InterContinental's Holiday Inn brand.

Also on 5 August 2011, the company announced that the resort complex would officially be named Sands Cotai Central.

Opening

The resort complex opened on 11 April 2012, featuring the four-star Holiday Inn Macao, Cotai Central, the world's largest Holiday Inn, with more than 1,200 rooms, and the five-star Conrad Macao, Cotai Central, with more than 600 rooms.

The opening ceremony was announced as "Asia's Biggest Launch Party in 2012". It was marked by the feat of high wire walker Jade Kindar-Martin and his wife Karine Mauffrey, traversing the 525 meter (1,700 feet) distance between the top of the Venetian and the new Conrad Hotel, whilst balancing 150 meters (500 feet) above the ground on a wire less than one inch thick. The spectacle was accompanied by the China National Symphony Orchestra.

The second phase, consisting of the twin-towered five-star Sheraton Macao Hotel, Cotai Central, opened on 20 September 2012. The 4,001-room Sheraton was both the largest hotel in Macau and the largest Sheraton in the world.

The third phase, The St. Regis Macao, Cotai Central and branded residences, opened on 17 December 2015, as the fourth tower of the Sands Cotai Central.

On 18 January 2016, the Sheraton Macao Hotel, Cotai Central was upgraded to the brand's premium Sheraton Grand tier and renamed Sheraton Grand Macao Hotel, Cotai Central.

Rebranding
In 2017, Las Vegas Sands announced plans to renovate Sands Cotai Central with a London theme and rebrand it as The Londoner Macao, due to disappointing results at the property. The Holiday Inn Macao, Cotal Central closed in 2019 and was overhauled and rebranded as The Londoner Hotel with half the number of rooms, while the "Cotai Central" branding was dropped from the St. Regis, Conrad and Sheraton hotels.

The entire complex was officially rebranded The Londoner Macao on 8 February 2021, when the first phase of the renovated property celebrated its grand opening. The first phase includes the opening of The Londoner Hotel, an all-new Crystal Palace atrium featuring a replica of the Shaftesbury Memorial Fountain, new dining options, and a number of interactive attractions that are themed to London. A British-style exclusive club for guests of The Londoner Hotel, The Residence, also opened its doors as part of Phase 1.

Later phases, progressively completed throughout 2021, includes the Suites by David Beckham situated at the top two floors of The Londoner Hotel, a 370-room Londoner Court, a re-themed and expanded Shoppes at Londoner, and the 6000-seat Londoner Arena. Later phases of the rebranding also saw the completion of the Houses of Parliament facade, a life-sized Big Ben, and a Changing of The Guard show held at the Crystal Palace atrium.

Hotels in The Londoner Macao 
Hotels that are part of The Londoner Macao are as follow:

Macanese firsts

Many companies opened their first Macau stores in The Londoner Macao:
Marks & Spencer - August 2014
Zara Home - August 2014
Lady M - July 2018 
Haidilao - October 2019
The Cheesecake Factory - October 2019 
Taier Sauerkraut Fish - August 2020
North Palace - December 2020
The Huaiyang Garden - January 2021
Shake Shack - April 2021 
The Mews - coming soon
Gordon Ramsay Pub & Grill - coming soon
Nusr-Et - planning

Transportation

Bus 
There are several shuttle bus services connecting The Londoner Macao to Macau's major ports of entry and nearby resorts. These shuttle services are provided free of charge. However, due to the COVID-19 pandemic, some services are temporarily not in operation.

 The Londoner Macao to Border Gate
 The Londoner Macao to Hengqin Port
 The Londoner Macao to The Parisian Macao, The Venetian Macao, and Taipa Ferry Terminal

Macau Light Rapid Transit 

The Londoner Macao is within walking distance from both Cotai West Station and Cotai East Station on the Taipa section of the Macau Light Rapid Transit that serves the Cotai Strip and the larger area of Cotai.

Gallery

See also
 Gambling in Macau
List of properties on the Cotai Strip 
 List of Macau casinos

References

External links

Official website
Sands China. Our Development Projects
Sheraton Grand Macao official website
Conrad Macao official website
The St. Regis Macao official website

Casinos completed in 2012
Hotel buildings completed in 2012
Hotels in Macau
Resorts in Macau
Casinos in Macau
2012 establishments in Macau
Cotai